King & Queen was a eurobeat group under the A-Beat C label. This is one of the female group projects on the said label, alongside Go Go Girls, Groove Twins, A-Beat Sisters, 70s Queens, Three Of Spades and Happy Hour. Vocalists in this group include Elena Ferretti, Alessandra Mirka Gatti, Francesca Contini, Elena Gobbi, Denise De Vincenzo and Annerley Gordon. King & Queen are generally known for their contributions to the Initial D anime series, mainly "Dancing Queen" (Initial D: First Stage) and "Speedy Runner" (Initial D: Fifth Stage)

Discography

Eurobeat musicians